Gürcülü is a village in the Qubadli District of Azerbaijan.

Notable natives 
 Nazar Heydarov — Chairman of the Presidium of the Supreme Soviet of Azerbaijan SSR (1949–1954).

References 

Populated places in Qubadli District